Australia competed at the 2013 World Championships in Athletics in Moscow, Russia, from 10–18 August 2013.
A team of 47 athletes was announced to represent the country in the event.

Medallists
The following Australian competitors won medals at the Championships

Results
(q – qualified, NM – no mark, SB – season best)

Men
Track and road events

Field events

Women
Track and road events

Field events

See also
Australia at other World Championships in 2013
 Australia at the 2013 UCI Road World Championships
 Australia at the 2013 World Aquatics Championships

References

External links
IAAF World Championships – Australia

Nations at the 2013 World Championships in Athletics
World Championships in Athletics
2013